Lone Hill is a suburb north of Johannesburg, South Africa. It is located in Region E. Lone Hill is in the Gauteng province and is a suburb in Sandton. 

Lone Hill is an upmarket area mostly composed of residential properties.

It is named after Lonehill.

Amenities

 Fourways Crossing Shopping Centre
 Lone Hill Fire Department
 Lone Hill Park
 Lone Hill Municipal Nature Reserve (with views over the suburb)
 Lonehill Academy

References

Johannesburg Region E